The British Rail Class 717 Desiro City is an electric multiple unit passenger train built by Siemens Mobility, currently operated by Govia Thameslink Railway on its Great Northern Hertford Loop and Welwyn stopping routes. Built to replace Class 313 trains on services into Moorgate, a total of 25 six-car units began entering regular service from March 2019. The units are stylistically similar to the Class 700s (in use with Thameslink) and the Class 707s (in use with Southeastern and South Western Railway.)

History
Upon winning the Thameslink, Southern and Great Northern franchise, Govia Thameslink Railway (GTR) announced that it would seek to replace the existing  units (which were 40 years old in 2016) operating on services to and from Moorgate, with up to 25 six-car units intended to be procured. In December 2015, GTR announced that it had selected Siemens to provide this new fleet, originally designated Class 713, as a follow-on order from the main Class 700 order, with entry into service expected from March 2019.
The order was finalised in February 2016.

A significant difference between Class 717s and the earlier Class 700s is the provision of fold-down emergency doors at both ends of each train. These are required for emergency evacuation of passengers while inside the deep-level Moorgate tunnels.

Siemens began testing the Class 717 units in Germany during June 2018.

Operation 
The first unit operated a single preview service in late September 2018, with gradual introduction from the spring of 2019. The final Class 313 service on Great Northern ran in September 2019, completing the fleet replacement by Class 717 units.

In-cab signalling 
In September 2021, the European Train Control System installation aboard the Class 717 fleet was successfully tested on the Thameslink 'core' route between St Pancras International and Blackfriars stations in central London. The success of the test allows Network Rail to work towards upgrading the Northern City Line to ETCS in 2022, which will be followed by the decommissioning and removal of the existing conventional signalling system in 2023. Further testing and implementation on other lines and routes is planned.

Environment 
Class 717 trains generate electricity through regenerative braking. The trains are also 20% lighter than their predecessors, making them more energy efficient.

Fleet details

References

External links
Great Northern Rail  page about the introduction of the 717s

717
Siemens multiple units
Train-related introductions in 2018
25 kV AC multiple units
750 V DC multiple units